This page lists the winners and nominees for the Soul Train Music Award for Best R&B/Soul Male Artist, which was first given in 2009. Trey Songz, Miguel, Maxwell, Bruno Mars and Chris Brown are the only artists to win the award twice.

Winners and nominees
Winners are listed first and highlighted in bold.

2000s

2010s

2020s

References

Soul Train Music Awards